Solo Guitar  may refer to:
Solo Guitar (Derek Bailey album) an album by Derek Bailey recorded in 1971
Solo Guitar (Ted Greene album) a 1977 debut album by Ted Greene 
Solo Guitar (Earl Klugh album), a 1989 studio album by Earl Klugh
 Solo Guitar (Alan Sparhawk album), a 2006 album